Sanjay Subrahmanyam (born 21 May 1961) is an Indian historian who specialises in the early modern period and in connected history. He is the author of several books and publications. He holds the Irving and Jean Stone Endowed Chair in Social Sciences at UCLA which he joined in 2004.

Background and education
Sanjay Subramanyam is the son of K. Subrahmanyam and his wife Sulochana. His father, K. Subrahmanyam, was a prominent expert on strategic affairs. Sanjay has an older sister and two older brothers, namely Subrahmanyam Jaishankar, who retired from the Indian Foreign Service as its head, and serves now as India's Minister of External Affairs as part of the BJP; and S. Vijay Kumar, who followed their father into the Indian Administrative Service. Subrahmanyam is married to a UCLA historian of modern France, Caroline Ford.

Sanjay Subrahmanyam graduated with a BA (Hons) in economics from St. Stephen's College, Delhi. He received his MA and PhD in 1987 in economic history from the Delhi School of Economics on the topic of "Trade and the Regional Economy of South India, c. 1550–1650".

Work
Subrahmanyam taught economic history and comparative economic development at the Delhi School of Economics till 1995. He then moved to Paris as Directeur d'études in the École des hautes études en sciences sociales, where he taught history of the Mughal empire, and the comparative history of early modern empires till 2002. In 2002, Subrahmanyam moved to Oxford University as the first holder of the newly created Chair in Indian History and Culture. In 2004 he became the Navin and Pratima Doshi Chair in Indian History at UCLA, and a year later, in 2005, he became the founding Director of UCLA's Center for India and South Asia. In 2014 he was appointed to the Irving and Jean Stone Endowed Chair in Social Sciences at UCLA.

Accolades
In 2012, Subrahmanyam was awarded the first Infosys Prize in Humanities, for his 'path-breaking contribution to history'. He also served as a Humanities jury member for the prize from 2019.

He was elected to the American Academy of Arts and Sciences in 2009 and as a corresponding fellow to the British Academy in 2016. Bryn Mawr College in Pennsylvania selected Dr. Subrahmanyam as the 2009 Mary Flexner Lecturer. He was elected professor and to the chair Histoire Globale de la Première Modernité at the Collège de France in 2013.

On 67 February 2017, Subrahmanyam received an honoris causa doctorate from the Université catholique de Louvain.

The Martine Aublet Prize for 2018 was awarded to Subrahmanyam for his book, L'inde sous les yeux de l'Europe: mots, peuples, empires (Alma Editeur, 2018), by the Musée de Quai Branly.

In February 2019, Sanjay Subrahmanyam was awarded the controversial Dan David Prize for History (jointly with Kenneth Pomeranz, Chicago).

In 2022, Sanjay Subrahmanyam was awarded the Comité International des Sciences Historiques (CISH) Prize in History at the XXIII Congress of the Historical Sciences in Poznan, Poland.

Historian Srinath Raghavan wrote of Subrahmanyam in 2013,

His scholarship spans the entire early modern period, from the 15th to 18th centuries CE, and more besides. Similarly, his geographical expertise stretches from South, South-East and West Asia to Western Europe and Latin America. Then there are his technical skills, ranging from statistical analysis of economic data to interpretation of literary and visual materials. Although Subrahmanyam began as an economic historian, he has branched out to work on political, intellectual and cultural history. He works in over ten European and Asian languages and draws on sources from a dazzling array of archives. Finally, there is his sheer productivity. Subrahmanyam seems to write top-class history faster than most of us can read.

Selected publications
The Political Economy of Commerce: Southern India, 1500–1650, Cambridge: Cambridge University Press, 1990.
Improvising Empire: Portuguese Trade and Settlement in the Bay of Bengal, 1500–1700, Delhi: Oxford University Press, 1990.
The Portuguese Empire in Asia, 1500–1700: A Political and Economic History, London and New York: Longman, 1993.
The Career and Legend of Vasco da Gama, Cambridge: Cambridge University Press, 1997.
Penumbral Visions: Making Polities in Early Modern South India, Delhi/Ann Arbor: Oxford University Press/University of Michigan Press, 2001.
Explorations in Connected History: From the Tagus to the Ganges, Delhi: Oxford University Press, 2004.
Explorations in Connected History: Mughals and Franks, Delhi: Oxford University Press, 2004.
Three Ways to be Alien: Travails and Encounters in the Early Modern World, (Menahem Stern Jerusalem Lectures), Waltham (Mass.): Brandeis University Press, 2011
French translation: Comment être un étranger: Goa – Ispahan – Venise, XVIe-XVIIIe siècles, Paris: Editions Alma, 2013.
Courtly Encounters: Translating Courtliness and Violence in Early Modern Eurasia (Mary Flexner Lectures), Cambridge, Mass.: Harvard University Press, 2012.
Impérios em Concorrência: Histórias Conectadas nos Séculos XVI e XVII, Lisbon: Imprensa de Ciências Sociais, 2012.
Is 'Indian Civilization' a Myth?: Fictions and Histories, Ranikhet: Permanent Black, 2013 
Revised French version: Leçons indiennes: Itinéraires d'un historien, Paris: Editions Alma, 2015.
Aux origines de l'histoire globale (Leçon inaugurale au Collège de France), Paris: Fayard, 2014.
Mondi connessi: La storia oltre l'eurocentrismo, sec. XVI-XVIII, Rome: Carocci, 2014.
L’Inde sous les yeux de l’Europe. Mots, peuples, empires 1500-1800, Paris, Alma, 2018.
Empires Between Islam and Christianity, 1500-1800, New York: State University of New York Press, 2019.
Faut-il universaliser l’histoire? Entre dérives nationalistes et identitaires, Paris: CNRS editions, 2020.

Co-author
(with Velcheru Narayana Rao and David Shulman), Symbols of Substance: Court and State in Nayaka-period Tamil Nadu, Delhi: Oxford University Press, 1992.
(with Velcheru Narayana Rao and David Shulman) Textures of Time: Writing History in South India, 1600–1800, New Delhi: Permanent Black, 2001.
(with Muzaffar Alam) Indo-Persian Travels in the Age of Discoveries, 1400–1800, Cambridge: Cambridge University Press, 2007.
(with Muzaffar Alam) Writing the Mughal World, Ranikhet/New York: Permanent Black/Columbia University Press, 2011.

Editor/co-editor
(Ed.) Merchants, Markets and the State in Early Modern India, Delhi: Oxford University Press, 1990.
(Ed.) Money and the Market in India, 1100–1700, Delhi: Oxford University Press, (Series: Themes in Indian History), 1994.
(Ed.) Merchant Networks in the Early Modern World (volume 8 of An Expanding World). Aldershot: Variorum Books, 1996.
(Ed. with Kaushik Basu) Unravelling the Nation: Sectarian Conflict and India's Secular Identity, New Delhi: Penguin Books, 1996.
(Ed. with Burton Stein) Institutions and Economic Change in South Asia, Delhi: Oxford University Press, 1996.
(Ed. with Muzaffar Alam) The Mughal State, 1526–1750, Delhi: Oxford University Press (Series: Themes in Indian History), 1998.
(Ed.) Sinners and Saints: The Successors of Vasco da Gama, Delhi: Oxford University Press, 1998.
(Ed. with Claude Markovits and Jacques Pouchepadass) Society and Circulation: Mobile People and Itinerant Cultures in South Asia, 1750–1950, New Delhi: Permanent Black, 2003.
(Ed.) Land, Politics and Trade in South Asia, Delhi: Oxford University Press, 2004.
(Ed. with Kenneth McPherson) From Biography to History: Essays in the History of Portuguese Asia (1500–1800), New Delhi: TransBooks, 2006.
(Ed. with David Armitage) The Age of Revolutions in Global Context, c. 1760-1840, Basingstoke: Palgrave Macmillan, 2009.
(Co-editor) The Cambridge World History, Vol. VI: The Construction of a Global World, 1400-1800 CE, Books 1 & 2, Cambridge: Cambridge University Press, 2015.
(Ed. with Henning Trüper and Dipesh Chakrabarty) Historical Teleologies in the Modern World, London: Bloomsbury, 2015.

Notes

External links

1961 births
Statutory Professors of the University of Oxford
Delhi School of Economics alumni
20th-century Indian historians
Indian emigrants to the United States
Living people
University of California, Los Angeles faculty
American male writers of Indian descent
American academics of Indian descent
Academic staff of the School for Advanced Studies in the Social Sciences
Academic staff of the Collège de France
Historians of South Asia
Corresponding Fellows of the British Academy